The Carmelite Friary, Winchester was a friary in Hampshire, England.  It was founded in 1278 and suppressed in the early sixteenth century.

References

Friaries in Hampshire
Winchester
History of Winchester